Samuel Challinor (2 April 1890 – 15 March 1963) was a professional football wing half who made over 100 appearances in the Football League for Brentford, New Brighton, Halifax Town and Accrington Stanley.

Playing career 
Challinor began his career in non-League football with Combination and Lancashire Combination clubs Middlewich and Witton Albion respectively, before earning a move to the Football League with Everton. The outbreak of the First World War in 1914 denied Challinor the chance to make his professional debut for the Toffees. After the war, Challinor played for Tranmere Rovers and then joined Third Division club Brentford, for the Griffin Park club's first season of League football in 1920. He made 32 appearances, scored two goals and was released at the end of a disastrous season for Brentford, which saw the club forced to apply for re-election. Challinor played for League clubs Halifax Town, Accrington Stanley and New Brighton throughout the early/mid 1920s and finished his career in Wales with spells at Mold Town and Llandudno.

Career statistics

References

1890 births
English footballers
People from Middlewich
Witton Albion F.C. players
Brentford F.C. players
English Football League players
Everton F.C. players
Halifax Town A.F.C. players
Association football wing halves
Accrington Stanley F.C. (1891) players
New Brighton A.F.C. players
Llandudno F.C. players
1963 deaths
Sportspeople from Cheshire
Tranmere Rovers F.C. players